The acronym IDX may refer to:

 .idx file extension, used by various programs to represent an index of some kind, commonly used by the DirectVobSub add-on for subtitle files
 IDX Systems, a software company, portions now owned by GE and athenahealth
 The ICAO airline code for Indonesia AirAsia X
 Indonesia Stock Exchange
 IDX Channel, an Indonesian channel jointly owned by Indonesia Stock Exchange and MNC Media
 IDX Composite, the Indonesia Stock Exchange composite index
 Intact dilation and extraction, an abortion procedure
 Internet Data Exchange